Events from the year 1624 in Denmark.

Incumbents 

 Monarch – Christian IV
 Steward of the Realm;

Events 
 February 28 – A decree made it explicitly illegal for Jesuits and monks to appear in the country.
 December 24 – Royal Danish Mail is founded.

Undated 
 The market hall Børsen opens in Copenhagen.

Births

Deaths 
7 February – Cort Aslakssøn, astronomer, theologist and (born 1564)

References 

 
Denmark
Years of the 17th century in Denmark